Corridor is a 2012 horror short film written, edited, directed by Saumin Mehta and produced by Rohit Gupta and Saumin Mehta. The film was acquired for digital distribution by Pocket Films and subsequently released on YouTube in December of the same year. On October 23, 2014 NDTV Prime - India's prime national television channel broadcast the film nationwide.

Plot
Corridor is a short film about a young man, who on the way to his apartment one night, starts hearing uncanny sounds. Convinced that he is being followed, he starts to run in panic through those endless empty corridors, till he has nowhere to hide and waits for the mystery to unfold.

Cast
Dhwanit Mehta
Meghana Shah
Anaya Shah

Accolades
Nominee for the "Best South Asian Short Film" at the World Music & Independent Film Festival in Washington, D.C., USA
Official Selection at the Mumbai Shotz in India.
Official Selection at Directors Circle Festival of Shorts in PA, USA. 
NDTV Prime broadcast the film nationwide in India.

References

External links
Official Website
Corridor at the Internet Movie Database

2012 short films
2012 horror films
2012 films
2010s English-language films